Sandrine Pinna (born 10 April 1987) is a Taiwanese actress who started her career as a child actress and appeared in many advertisements.

Early life 
Sandrine Pinna was born on 10 April 1987 to a Taiwanese mother and a French father. Her father was a lawyer. Her parents divorced when she was a child. After her father returned to France, Pinna was raised by her mother. Her father died in May 2011.

Career 
Pinna completed a degree in radio, film and television from Shih Hsin University. After earning her degree, she became a professional actress.

Her notable works include  Yang Yang, Miao Miao, Candy Rain, Touch of the Light, See You Tomorrow and Legend of the Demon Cat.

She participated in the HBO Asia TV series “Trinity of Shadows” which consists of 15 one-hour episodes, playing as lead detective. The first two will launch on June 13, 2021, and be followed every subsequent Sunday with further instalments. The series will play on HBO Go and HBO in Asia.

Personal life 
In February 2013, Pinna married Taiwanese singer-songwriter Jeremy Ji. Their daughter, Chantel, was born in August that year.

Filmography

Film

Television series

Music video

Awards and nominations

References

External links
 
 
Sandrine Pinna on Sina Weibo 
 

1987 births
Living people
Taiwanese child actresses
Taiwanese film actresses
Taiwanese television actresses
Shih Hsin University alumni
Actresses from Taipei
Taiwanese people of French descent
21st-century Taiwanese actresses